Amahlathi Local Municipality is an administrative area in the Amatole District of the Eastern Cape in South Africa. Amahlati is an isiXhosa name that means "a place where many trees are grouped together, a forest". Forests are a key feature of the area.

Main places
The 2001 census divided the municipality into the following main places:

Politics 

The municipal council consists of thirty members elected by mixed-member proportional representation. Fifteen councillors are elected by first-past-the-post voting in fifteen wards, while the remaining fifteen are chosen from party lists so that the total number of party representatives is proportional to the number of votes received. In the election of 1 November 2021 the African National Congress (ANC) won a majority of twenty-three seats on the council.

The following table shows the results of the election.

References

External links
 http://www.amahlathi.gov.za

Local municipalities of the Amatole District Municipality